The men's shot put event at the 1997 Summer Universiade was held at the Stadio Cibali in Catania, Italy on 30 August.

Medalists

Results

Qualification

Final

References

Athletics at the 1997 Summer Universiade
1997